XHYN-FM is a radio station on 102.9 FM in Oaxaca, Oaxaca. It is owned by Radiorama and is known as Retro 102.9.

History
XEYN-AM 820 received its concession on June 15, 1992. It was cleared to move to FM in 2010.

On August 5, 2019, the station dropped the Los 40 franchise and became Estéreo Joven, retaining the pop format. On August 20, the station rebranded again as Retro 102.9.

References

Radio stations in Oaxaca City